Oliver Taylor (1880–unknown) was an English footballer who played in the Football League for West Bromwich Albion.

References

1880 births
English footballers
Association football goalkeepers
English Football League players
West Bromwich Albion F.C. players
Bilston Town F.C. players
Coventry City F.C. players
Year of death missing